Saulius Atmanavičius (born 8 February 1970) is a retired Lithuanian football defender, who last played for Rodovitas Klaipėda during his professional career. He obtained a total number of three caps for the Lithuania national football team, scoring no goals.

Honours
National Team
 Baltic Cup
 1991

External links
 

1970 births
Living people
Lithuanian footballers
Lithuania international footballers
Expatriate footballers in Latvia
FK Sirijus Klaipėda players
FBK Kaunas footballers
FK Atlantas players
FK Liepājas Metalurgs players
Lithuanian expatriate sportspeople in Latvia
Lithuanian football referees
Association football defenders